Surface activity may refer to
 
 Plate tectonics, a form of planetary surface activity

See also
 Surfactant, a surface active agent